The following is a list of recurring characters and sketches as well as other featured sketches from the CBS comedy and variety show The Carol Burnett Show starring Carol Burnett, Harvey Korman, Vicki Lawrence, Lyle Waggoner and Tim Conway.

Characters and sketches

Alice Portnoy
Burnett as a little girl who is a member of the Fireside Girls of America, a Girl Scout-type of organization, always trying to blackmail adults into making a contribution to her troop. Lawrence has played her sister Cecily.

As the Stomach Turns

A soap opera parody taking place in the fictional town of Canoga Falls with Burnett as the main character Marian Clayton. Other recurring residents of Canoga Falls include Conway as different variations of the Oldest Man, Korman as Mother Marcus and Lawrence as Marion's daughter who always comes home with a baby.

Carol and Sis
Burnett as Carol and Lawrence as her sister Chris with Korman as Carol's husband Roger; the sketch was based on Burnett's life in New York raising her kid sister in New York with her first husband, and Lawrence was originally hired just for this sketch.

Charwoman
Burnett's signature character, an unnamed charwoman, most often in a musical number, whose animated image has been used in the opening credits, and also in the opening and closing credits of Carol Burnett and Friends.

Chiquita
Burnett's parody of Charo. In one sketch, Charo herself played Chiquita and Burnett played her mother.

The Family

Burnett and Korman as Eunice and Ed Higgins, a married couple, with Lawrence portraying Eunice's very difficult mother "Mama" Thelma Harper in the southern city of Raytown. The sketch's original premise featured Eunice's brother Phillip, played by Roddy McDowall, coming to visit the family. Later on, other children of Mama's were introduced, including Betty White as Ellen, Alan Alda as Larry and Tommy Smothers as Jack. In addition, Conway played Mickey Hart, Ed's business partner. In the eleventh season, after Korman's departure, Dick van Dyke was introduced as Dan Fogarty, an old friend of Ed's.

Fireside Chat
Korman and Burnett as the President of the United States and the First Lady, with Lawrence as their daughter. The premise was to parody a "perfect" First Family speaking to the American people, and also included their maid, usually Minerva played by Isabel Sanford.

George and Zelda
Burnett as Zelda, a whiny, nasal-voiced woman and Korman as her husband George. The sketch was inspired by the roles of Montgomery Clift and Shelley Winters in A Place in the Sun Lawrence has occasionally played Zelda's mother.

The Ham Actors
Also known as "Funt and Mundane", Korman as Alfred Funt and Burnett as Mundane, two over-the-top actors who run into mishaps on the stage. The sketch started off with Korman as Funt and Burnett as different types of partners. The names Funt and Mundane are take-offs of legendary acting couple Alfred Lunt and Lynn Fontanne.

Kitchen Commercials
Burnett as a woman who is tortured by television commercial mascots come to life.

Mother Marcus
Korman as a full-figured, Yiddish grandmother who was based on his own real-life grandmother. She was usually featured in "As the Stomach Turns", but has also been in other sketches such as the grandmother in "La Caperucita Roja", the Mexican version of "Little Red Riding Hood", the fairy godmother in "Cinderella Gets It On!", the disco version of "Cinderella", and the first Mrs. de Wintry in "Rebecky", the take-off of the 1940 film Rebecca.

Nora Desmond
Burnett as a has-been silent film actress and Korman as her bald, dutiful butler Max in the take-off of the 1950 film Sunset Boulevard. Gloria Swanson has praised Burnett for the character.

The Old Folks
Burnett and Korman as Molly and Bert, an elderly couple who sit in rocking chairs on a porch talking about their lives.

The Oldest Man

Conway as Duane Toddleberry, an old, slow-moving man, usually in various situations involving Korman being annoyed with his lack of speed.

The Queen
Burnett's parody of Queen Elizabeth II, who made her debut on the interview sketch "V.I.P." Later on she appeared with Korman as her consort and mostly with Conway as Private Arthur Newberry, a soldier who is completely hollow due to having swallowed a live grenade. The premise with Private Newberry was his ridiculous requests, such as asking for animal-flavored ice cream or calling a ship dedicated to him as "M/S Stinky". Lawrence once played the princess and was engaged to the hollowed-out private.

Rhoda Dimple
Burnett's parody of Shirley Temple.

Stella Toddler
Burnett as an elderly woman who always ends up in unfortunate accidents.

10th Avenue Family
Burnett and Korman as Stella and Harry, an unemployed married couple, and Waggoner as their 15-year-old son Brewster and Lawrence as their 12-year-old daughter Dulcie.

Unforgettable Commercials
Parodies of well-known commercials of the time featuring the entire cast. This was an annual sketch.

V.I.P.
Korman as F. Lee Carman, who interviews famous "celebrities", parodied by Burnett, such as Julia Wild (Julia Child), Shirley Dimple (Shirley Temple) and Mae East (Mae West), as well as other guests such as a nudist.

Mrs. Wiggins

Also known as "Mr. Tudball and Mrs. Wiggins", Conway as Mr. Tudball, a businessman who speaks in a mock Romanian accent, putting up with his empty-headed secretary Mrs. Wiggins played by Burnett; Lawrence occasionally played Mrs. Tudball.

Movie parodies
A regular feature of The Carol Burnett Show was its many movie parody sketches, many of which were written or co-written by Stan Hart, Arnie Kogen and Larry Siegel, all prolific contributors for Mad magazine, with each authoring dozens of the magazine's own movie satires. In the early seasons, the movie take-off would begin as a "Metro Golden Mouth" production with Burnett doing her Tarzan yell as a parody of the MGM Lion. In addition, the show featured shorter movie parody sketches as part of a tribute to a specific studio or director.

Went with the Wind!

Perhaps the show's best known movie parody is the 1976 Gone with the Wind sketch entitled "Went with the Wind!" It features the famous scene in which Starlett O'Hara must fashion a gown from window curtains, and Burnett, as Starlett, descends a long staircase wearing the green curtains complete with hanging rod. When Korman as Ratt Butler compliments her "gown", she replies, "Thank you. I saw it in the window and I just couldn't resist it." The outfit, designed by Bob Mackie, is now in the Kennedy Center Honors collection of the Smithsonian Institution's National Museum of American History.

Other movie parodies
A list of other movie parody sketches on The Carol Burnett Show include:

"Back Alley" (Back Street)
"Babes in Barns" (Babes in Arms)
"Beach Blanket Boo-Boo" (Beach Blanket Bingo)
"The Boring Twenties" (The Roaring Twenties)
"Caged Dames" (Caged)
"Disaster '75" (Airport)
"Dr. Nose" (Dr. No)
"The Doily Sisters" (The Dolly Sisters)
"Double Calamity" (Double Indemnity)
"The Enchanted Hovel" (The Enchanted Cottage)
"Fran Sancisco"  (San Francisco)
"From Here to Infinity" (From Here to Eternity)
"Jowls" (Jaws)
"The Lady Heir" (The Heiress)
"The Lavender Pimpernel" (The Scarlet Pimpernel)
"The Little Foxies" (The Little Foxes)
"Little Miss Showbiz" (Little Miss Broadway)
"Lovely Story" (Love Story)
"Mildred Fierce" (Mildred Pierce)
"The Murderer Always Rings Twice" (The Postman Always Rings Twice)
"Natural Velvet" (National Velvet)
"Naughty Rosemarie" (Rose Marie)
"The Putrified Forest" (The Petrified Forest)
"Raised to Be Rotten" (Born to Be Bad)
"Rancid Harvest" (Random Harvest)
"Rebecky" (Rebecca)
"Riverboat" (Show Boat)
"Slippery When Wet" (Dangerous When Wet)
"So Proudly We Heal" (So Proudly We Hail!)
"A Swiped Life" (A Stolen Life)
"Torchy Song" (Torch Song)
"Waterloo Bilge" (Waterloo Bridge)
"When My Baby Laughs at Me" (When My Baby Smiles at Me)

References

Carol Burnett
Lists of comedy sketches